The men's artistic individual all-around gymnastic event at the 2015 Pan American Games was held on July 13 at the Toronto Coliseum.

Schedule
All times are Eastern Standard Time (UTC-3).

Results

Qualification
Osvaldo Martinez of Argentina finished in 16th but did not progress to the final due to the fact that his teammates, Nicolas Cordoba and Federico Molinari qualified ahead of him.

Qualification Legend: Q = Qualified to apparatus final; R = Qualified to apparatus final as reserve

Final

References

Gymnastics at the 2015 Pan American Games